Indothais rufotincta is a species of sea snail, a marine gastropod mollusk, in the family Muricidae, the murex snails or rock snails.

Description
The length of the shell attains 30 mm.

Distribution
This marine species occurs off Singapore.

References

External links
 Tan K.S. & Sigurdsson J.B. (1996) Two new species of Thais (Mollusca: Neogastropoda: Muricidae) from peninsular Malaysia and Singapore, with notes on T. tissoti (Petit, 1852) and T. blanfordi (Melvill, 1893) from Bombay, India. Raffles Bulletin of Zoology 44(1): 77-107

rufotincta
Gastropods described in 1996